is a former international table tennis player from Japan.

Table tennis career
She won a gold medal at the 1954 World Table Tennis Championships in the Corbillon Cup with Fujie Eguchi, Yoshiko Tanaka and Kiiko Watanabe.

See also
 List of table tennis players
 List of World Table Tennis Championships medalists

References

Japanese female table tennis players
Living people
Place of birth missing (living people)
World Table Tennis Championships medalists
Year of birth missing (living people)